The 2008–09 Burger King Whoppers season was the seventh season of the franchise in the Philippine Basketball Association (PBA). The team were previously known as Air21 Express in the Philippine Cup.

Key dates
August 30: The 2008 PBA Draft took place in Fort Bonifacio, Taguig.
September 1: The free agency period started.

Draft picks

Roster

Depth chart

Philippine Cup

Eliminations

Standings

Game log

|- bgcolor="#edbebf"
| 1
| October 5
| Rain or Shine
| 102–120
| De Ocampo (21)
| De Ocampo (13)
| De Ocampo (6)
| Cuneta Astrodome
| 0–1
|- bgcolor="#edbebf"
| 2
| October 9
| Talk 'N Text
| 101–112
| David (23)
| Quiñahan (17) 
| Quiñahan, Arboleda (4)
| Ynares Sports Arena 
| 0–2
|- bgcolor="#edbebf"
| 3
| October 12
| Ginebra
| 92–101
| Santos (23)
| De Ocampo (11)
| Arboleda (6)
| Araneta Coliseum
| 0–3
|- bgcolor="#bbffbb"
| 4
| October 17
| Coca-Cola
| 95-84
| Santos (25)
| De Ocampo (16)
| Cruz (5)
| Araneta Coliseum
| 1–3 
|- bgcolor="#bbffbb"
| 5
| October 24
| Sta. Lucia
| 107-83
| Santos (21)
| Santos, Quiñahan (9)
| Cruz (5)
| Ynares Center
| 2–3
|- bgcolor="#bbffbb"
| 6
| October 29
| Alaska
| 109-107
| Santos (25)
| Santos (14)
| Arboleda, Cruz (5)
| Araneta Coliseum
| 3–3
|- bgcolor="#edbebf"
| 7
| October 31
| Purefoods
| 105–108
| Se, Arboleda (25)
| De Ocampo (13)
| David (6) 
| Araneta Coliseum
| 3–4

|- bgcolor="#edbebf"
| 8
| November 5
| San Miguel
| 129–130
| David (36) 
| Santos (16)
| Arboleda (8)
| Araneta Coliseum
| 3–5
|- bgcolor="#bbffbb"
| 9
| November 8
| Rain or Shine
| 106-103
| David (27) 
| Kramer (15)
| David (5)
| Lucena City
| 4–5
|-bgcolor="#bbffbb"
| 10
| November 15
| Coca-Cola
| 111-101
| Santos (26)
| De Ocampo (13)
| Arboleda (10)
| Cuneta Astrodome
| 5–5
|-bgcolor="#bbffbb"
| 11
| November 21
| Red Bull
| 92-89
| Canaleta (20)
| Canaleta, De Ocampo (11)
| De Ocampo (5)
| Araneta Coliseum
| 6–5
|-bgcolor="#edbebf"
| 12
| November 26
| San Miguel
| 78–98
| Santos (17)
| De Ocampo (10)
| Cruz (5)
| Araneta Coliseum
| 6–6
|-bgcolor="#edbebf"
| 13
| November 29
| Purefoods
| 88–96
| David (22)
| Canaleta (11)
| Arboleda (6)
| Tacloban City
| 6–7

|-bgcolor="#bbffbb"
| 14
| December 5
| Ginebra
| 102-84
| David (24)
| De Ocampo (11)
| Cruz (6)
| Araneta Coliseum
| 7–7
|-bgcolor="#bbffbb"
| 15
| December 7
| Sta. Lucia
| 97-88
| De Ocampo (23)
| Canaleta (10)
| De Ocampo (7)
| Araneta Coliseum
| 8–7
|-bgcolor="#edbebf"
| 16
| December 12
| Red Bull
| 88–98
| De Ocampo (21)
| Canaleta (10) 
| De Ocampo (6)
| Araneta Coliseum
| 8–8
|-bgcolor="#edbebf"
| 17
| December 19
| Alaska
| 65–76
| Intal (17)
| Arboleda (8)
| Quiñahan (3)
| Ynares Center
| 8–9
|-bgcolor="#edbebf"
| 18
| December 25
| Talk 'N Text
| 108–109
| David (23)
| Quiñahan (9)
| Allado (6)
| Araneta Coliseum
| 8–10

Playoffs

Game log

|- bgcolor="#bbffbb"
| 1
| December 28
| Purefoods
| 94-82
| David (20)
| Santos (11)
| Arboleda (6)
| Araneta Coliseum
| Advanced
|- bgcolor="#edbebf"
| 2
| January 4
| San Miguel
|  86–105
| David (31)
| Allado (14)
| Quiñahan (3)
| Araneta Coliseum
| Eliminated

Statistics

Player Stats as of November 29, 2008. 10:00 p.m. PHI Time

Fiesta Conference

Eliminations

Standings

Game log

|- bgcolor="#bbffbb"
| 1
| February 28
| Sta. Lucia
| 96-87
| David (16)
| Daniels, Santos (13)
| David, Daniels (3)
| Dumaguete
| 1–0

|- bgcolor="#bbffbb"
| 2
| March 6
| Ginebra
| 110-106
| Santos (20)
| Daniels (10) 
| Daniels (8)
| Cuneta Astrodome 
| 2–0
|- bgcolor="#edbebf"
| 3
| March 8
| San Miguel
| 105–114
| Santos (26)
| Daniels (9)
| Arboleda, M. Cruz, Villanueva (5)
| Araneta Coliseum
| 2–1
|- bgcolor="#edbebf"
| 4
| March 14
| Talk 'N Text
| 114–117
| David (25)
| Daniels (16)
| Arboleda (9)
| Muntinlupa
| 2–2
|- bgcolor="#bbffbb"
| 5
| March 18
| Barako Bull
| 123-110
| Santos (22)
| Daniels (13)
| M. Cruz (5)
| Araneta Coliseum
| 3–2
|- bgcolor="#bbffbb"
| 6
| March 20
| Coca-Cola
| 127-109
| David (26)
| Daniels (10)
| Arboleda (5)
| Araneta Coliseum
| 4–2
|- bgcolor="#edbebf"
| 7
| March 25
| Rain or Shine
| 112–118
| David (27)
| Daniels (7)
| David, Baguio (5) 
| Araneta Coliseum
| 4–3

|- bgcolor="#edbebf"
| 8
| April 15
| Purefoods
| 78–82
| Santos (18)
| Daniels (7)
| Daniels (5)
| Araneta Coliseum
| 4–4
|- bgcolor="#edbebf"
| 9
| April 20
| Ginebra
| 94–100
| Billiones (27)
| Daniels (15)
| Daniels (7)
| Cuneta Astrodome
| 4–5
|-bgcolor="#bbffbb"
| 10
| April 30
| Barako Bull
| 99-89
| David (30)
| Daniels (11)
| Daniels, David (4)
| Ynares Sports Arena
| 5–5

|-bgcolor="#bbffbb"
| 11
| May 3
| Alaska Aces
|106-88
| Santos (31)
| Daniels (17)
| Arboleda, Daniels (5)
| Cuneta Astrodome
| 6–5
|-bgcolor="#bbffbb"
| 12
| May 10
| San Miguel
| 107-105
| David (23)
| Daniels (19)
| Daniels (4)
| Araneta Coliseum
| 7–5
|-bgcolor="#edbebf"
| 13
| May 13
| Talk 'N Text
| 129–135
| Daniels (27)
| Daniels (15)
| Arboleda(10)
| Cuneta Astrodome
| 7–6
|-bgcolor="#bbffbb"
| 14
| May 17
| Purefoods
| 96-86
| Santos (21)
| Daniels (21)
| Arboleda(5)
| Cuneta Astrodome
| 8–6

Awards and records

Awards

Records
Note: Air21 Express/Burger King Whoppers Records Only

Transactions

Trades

Free agents

Additions

Subtractions

References

Barako Bull Energy seasons
Burger King Whoppers